Dr. William Robert Denison Wiggins FFARCS MRCS (4 April 1913 – 17 October 1992) was a British medical practitioner and philatelist who in 1963 was awarded the Crawford Medal by the Royal Philatelic Society London for his work The Postage Stamps of Great Britain Part II.

Selected publications

The Postage Stamps of Great Britain, Part 2: Perforated line-engraved issues, London: Royal Philatelic Society London, 2nd ed., 1962. (Editor)
The plating of alphabet II : plates 1 to 21, AA to TL. 1974.
British line engraved stamps : repaired impressions : 1855-1879, one penny die II. Robson Lowe, 1982.

References

British philatelists
1992 deaths
British surgeons
1913 births
Fellows of the Royal Philatelic Society London
20th-century surgeons